Ulises Alfonso Fariñas (born December 29, 1985, in Elizabeth, New Jersey) is a Cuban-American comic book writer and artist.

Education
While attending New York's School of Visual Arts, Fariñas studied under Nick Bertozzi, who invited him to join the web comics collective Act-i-vate.

Career
Ulises Fariñas is the co-creator (along with writer Erick Freitas) of GAMMA, Motro, and Amazing Forest. He has worked as an artist on Catalyst Comix, and Transformers: Heart of Darkness.

IDW Comics hired Fariñas for art duties on Judge Dredd: Mega-City Two in 2014. He followed up that series in 2016 with Judge Dredd: Mega-City Zero, which he wrote.

In 2016, Fariñas and Storme Smith launched Buño, a publishing imprint at Magnetic Press. With Buño, Fariñas aims to provide an outlet which promotes creative freedom in storytelling and diversity of storytellers.

Personal life
Fariñas lives and works in upstate New York.

Bibliography

Buño, Magnetic Press
 Cloudia & Rex (writer, with Erick Freitas (co-writer), art by Daniel Irizarri, limited series, forthcoming: July 11, 2017)
 Guardian Force Design Manual (writer and artist, inked by Mike Prezzato, one-shot, forthcoming)

Dark Horse Comics
 Catalyst Comix (artist, with Joe Casey (writer), limited series, July 3, 2013-March 5, 2014)
 GAMMA (writer, with Erick Freitas (co-writer), one-shot, July 24, 2013)

IDW Comics
 Godzilla in Hell #3 (writer, with Erick Freitas (co-writer), art by Buster Moody, limited series, September 30, 2015)
 Godzilla: Rage Across Time #4 (writer, with Erick Freitas (co-writer), art by Pablo Tunica, limited series, November 16, 2016)
 Judge Dredd: Mega-City Two (artist, with colors by Ryan Hill, written by Douglas Wolk, limited series, 2014)
 Judge Dredd: Mega-City Zero (writer, with Erick Freitas (co-writer), art by Dan McDaid, limited series, 2015-2016)
 Transformers: Heart of Darkness (artist, with writers Dan Abnett and Andy Lanning, 4-issue limited series, March 23, 2011-June 29, 2011)

Marvel Comics
 Captain America & the Mighty Avengers #1 (variant cover artist, with writer Al Ewing, art by Luke Ross, November 12, 2014)

Oni Press
 Motro (writer and artist, with co-writer Erick Freitas, ongoing series, November 2016-present)

References

External links

Print interviews
Multiversity
Comics Alliance 
Comic Book Resources
Bleeding Cool
Comics Bulletin

Video interviews
New York Comic Con
Puerto Rico Comic Con

Audio interviews
Ignorant Bliss, podcast with Julian Lytle
Making Comics

1985 births
American comics writers
American comics artists
Artists from New Jersey
Living people
School of Visual Arts alumni